The Boy Who Stole the Elephant is a 1970 American television film starring Mark Lester. It was produced by Winston Hibler.

It was originally filmed as a two part episode of The Wonderful World of Disney. It was filmed in December 1969.

Plot

Cast
Mark Lester as Davey 
June Havoc as Molly Jeffrys 
David Wayne as Colonel Rufus Ryder
Parley Baer as Mayor Hancock
Whitney Blake as Helen Owens
Walter Burke as Tinker
Ernestine Clark as Nana
Tom Clark as Drake
Robert Emhardt as Cy Brown
William Fawcett as Elmer
Dabbs Greer as Stilts
Richard Kiel as Luke Brown
Betty Lynn as Lottie Ladare
Susan Olsen as Lucy Owens
Danny Rees as De Marco
Christopher Shea as Billy Owens 
Doris Singleton as Lizzie Ladare
Hal Smith as Reb Canfield 
James Westerfield as Sheriff Berry

References

External links
The Boy Who Stole the Elephant'' at IMDb

1970 television films
American television films
Films produced by Winston Hibler